The Prince William V Gallery is an art gallery on the Buitenhof in The Hague that currently shares an entrance with the Gevangenpoort museum. It is a recreation of the original gallery Galerij Prins Willem V, once founded there by William V, Prince of Orange in 1774. The displayed paintings are part of the collection of the Mauritshuis. Amongst the paintings on display are works by Peter Paul Rubens, Jan Steen, Paulus Potter and Gerard van Honthorst.

History
Though built in 1774, the gallery has not been continuously open, mostly because the collection was abducted by the French 20 years after it opened and another 20 years passed before most of the works were recovered. In the meantime another gallery was opened in nearby Huis ten Bosch and undeterred by events, Prince William continued collecting art for a new gallery. After recovery of most important works in 1815, the large collection was re-housed in 1822 in the Mauritshuis. The old location was kept on as an archive. It wasn't reopened as an art gallery until 1977.

Original 1774 gallery
The collection of paintings of the gallery had been established by previous stadtholders of the Netherlands, members of the House of Orange-Nassau. Prince William V inherited the family collection when he was just four years old, after his father died. At that time the paintings were spread out over a number of his residences. The prince took up a special interest in paintings and made his first buy when he was fifteen years old. Sometimes he would acquire an entire collection, such as the Govert van Slingelandt collection in 1768. In 1763 he instructed his court painter Tethart Haag to create an inventory of his extensive collection. The latter also served as curator to the collection of paintings owned by the stadtholder and was his chief adviser in the purchase of paintings. The prince aspired to be seen as an equal to the great monarchs of Europe and the possession of a great art collection was, at that time, considered to be an element typical of such a status. He decided to bring his collection together in one location, so he could present it to his guests. To that end he bought two adjacent houses near his residence in The Hague, where he planned for the construction of an art gallery for his collection. During this process Tethart Haag served as his main advisor. The gallery was consequently built in 1773–1774, according to the wishes of the prince and under the direction of Tethart Haag. In 1774 the gallery opened, and in addition to the guests of the prince, it became the first museum in the Netherlands where the general public was allowed to visit. The prince appointed Tethart Haag as the first director of the art gallery-museum. In 1795 the collection was abducted by the French and housed in the Louvre as war booty. Under a later treaty many paintings were recovered in 1815, but many were not, such as the portrait of William III of Orange, now in the Museum of Fine Arts of Lyon.

Some of the more notable works that were abducted to France and came back were:

Modern gallery
Since 2010, museum visitors can view the restored art gallery that can be reached through a special staircase that connects the two buildings. The collection which hangs here is a modern reconstruction of the original 1774 art cabinet that was situated upstairs above a fencing school. The paintings, taken from various collections,  hang crowded together on the walls in the style of the late 18th century. An effort is made to create an impression of the original gallery, rather than any historical accuracy in the choice where which paintings hang specifically. Former top pieces from the gallery such as Potter's Young Bull hang elsewhere, and the gallery itself underwent several changes in exhibition format after it reopened in 1815. Purchases made to replace lost paintings grew the collection so that in 1822 the collection (then called Koninklijk Kabinet van Schilderijen te 's-Gravenhage) was moved to the Mauritshuis Royal Picture Gallery which remains the formal owner of the paintings on display. The location was used as an archive until it reopened in 1977, but closed again as it underwent restoration work in 1993-1994 and in 2009.

References

Prince William V Gallery on Mauritshuis website
Illustrated guide to the collection in 1826 on Archive.org

Rijksmonuments in The Hague
Museums in The Hague
History of The Hague
Art museums established in 1774